Prednicarbate is a relatively new topical corticosteroid drug. It is similar in potency to hydrocortisone. Corticosteroids have always been an important part of the pharmacological arsenal of dermatology; however, their tendency to produce side-effects has caused the need to search for new preparations.

It is nonhalogenated.

References

Corticosteroid esters
Corticosteroids
Propionate esters
Carbonate esters